Thymidine diphosphate (TDP) or deoxythymidine diphosphate (dTDP) (also thymidine pyrophosphate, dTPP) is a nucleotide diphosphate. It is an ester of pyrophosphoric acid with the nucleoside thymidine. dTDP consists of the pyrophosphate group, the pentose sugar ribose, and the nucleobase thymine.  Unlike the other deoxyribonucleotides, thymidine diphosphate does not always contain the "deoxy" prefix in its name.

See also
 Nucleoside
 Nucleotide
 DNA
 RNA
 Oligonucleotide
 dTDP-glucose

References

External links

Nucleotides
Phosphate esters
Pyrophosphates
Pyrimidinediones